Madhavi Krishnaji Mantri  (1 September 1921 – 23 May 2014) was an Indian cricketer who played in four Test matches between 1951 and 1955. Born in Nasik, Maharashtra, he was a right-handed opening batsman and specialist wicket-keeper who represented Mumbai. He captained Mumbai to victory in three Ranji Trophy finals: 1951–52, 1955–56 and 1955–56. He captained Associated Cement Company to victory in the Moin-ud-Dowlah Gold Cup Tournament in 1962–63.

Mantri played his first Test against England in India in 1951–52 and toured England with the Indian team in 1952 (playing two Tests), and Pakistan in 1954–55 (one Test). His highest score was 200 for Mumbai in their victory over Maharashtra in a semi-final of the Ranji Trophy in 1948–49. It was the highest of nine centuries in a match in which 2376 runs were scored, which is still a record in first-class cricket.

He was among the four victims (others being Pankaj Roy, Dattajirao Gaekwad and Vijay Manjrekar) in India's miserable 0–4 start in the second innings of the Headingley Test of 1952 with Fred Trueman playing havoc.

Mantri was the uncle of former Indian cricket captain Sunil Gavaskar. Until his death, he lived in Hindu Colony, Dadar, Mumbai, and was the oldest living Indian Test cricketer. He suffered a heart attack on 1 May 2014 and was hospitalized at a private clinic. He died following another heart attack on 23 May 2014.

References

External links
 

1921 births
2014 deaths
India Test cricketers
Indian cricketers
Maharashtra cricketers
Mumbai cricketers
Hindus cricketers
West Zone cricketers
Associated Cement Company cricketers
Cricketers from Maharashtra
People from Nashik
Wicket-keepers